Caspar is a masculine given name. It may refer to:

People
 Caspar (magus), a name traditionally given to one of the Three Magi in the Bible who brought the baby Jesus gifts
Caspar Austa (born 1982), Estonian cyclist
Caspar Badrutt (1848–1904), Swiss businessman and pioneer of alpine resorts
Caspar Barlaeus (1584–1648), Dutch polymath, Renaissance humanist, theologian, poet and historian
Caspar Bartholin the Elder (1585–1629), Danish theologian and medical professor
Caspar Bartholin the Younger (1655–1738), Danish anatomist
Caspar Buberl (1834–1899), American sculptor
Caspar del Bufalo (1786–1837), Italian priest and saint
Caspar Commelijn (1668–1731), Dutch botanist
Caspar de Crayer (1582–1669), Flemish painter
Caspar Cruciger the Younger (1525–1597), German theologian, son of Caspar Creuziger
Caspar Creuziger or Caspar Cruciger the Elder (1504–1548), German humanist, professor of theology and preacher
Caspar Einem (born 1948), Austrian politician
Caspar Ett (1788–1847), German composer and organist
Caspar David Friedrich (1774–1840), German painter
Caspar F. Goodrich (1847–1925), US Navy rear admiral
Caspar René Gregory (1846–1917), American-born German theologian
Caspar Frederik Harsdorff (1735–1799), Danish architect
Caspar Hennenberger (1529–1600), German Lutheran pastor, historian and cartographer
Caspar John (1903–1984), British First Sea Lord and admiral of the fleet
Caspar Lee (1994), South African YouTuber and actor
Caspar Memering (born 1953), German former footballer
Caspar Neher (1897–1962), Austrian-German scenographer and librettist, best known for his work with Bertolt Brecht
Caspar Netscher (1639–1684), Dutch painter
Caspar Olevian (1536–1587), German theologian
Caspar Peucer (1525–1602), German reformer, physician and scholar
Caspar Georg Carl Reinwardt (1773–1854), Prussian-born Dutch botanist
Caspar de Robles, (1527–1585), ruler of two provinces of the Netherlands
Caspar Schoppe (1576–1649), German controversialist and scholar
Caspar Schütz (c. 1540–1594), German historian
Caspar Schwenckfeld (1489 or 1490–1561), German theologian, writer, preacher, Protestant Reformer and spiritualist
Caspar Stoll (probably between 1725 and 1730–1791), Dutch entomologist
Caspar Voght (1752–1839), German merchant and social reformer
Caspar Weinberger (1917–2006), American politician and U.S. Secretary of Defense
Caspar Wessel (1745–1818), Norwegian-Danish mathematician and cartographer
Caspar Wistar (glassmaker) (1696–1752), German-born glassmaker and landowner in Pennsylvania
Caspar Wistar (physician) (1761–1818), American physician and anatomist, grandson of the above
Caspar van Wittel (1652 or 1653–1736), Dutch painter
Caspar Whitney (1864–1929), American author, editor, explorer and war correspondent
Caspar Friedrich Wolff (1735–1794), German physiologist and one of the founders of embryology
Caspar Wrede (1929–1998), Finnish film and theatre director

Places
Caspar, California

Fictional characters
Caspar von Bergliez, a fictional character from the video game Fire Emblem: Three Houses

See also
 Casper (given name)

Masculine given names